The St. Joseph Autos were a minor league baseball team based in St. Joseph, Michigan. In 1940 and 1941, the Autos played exclusively as members of the Class C level Michigan State League, hosting home minor league games at Edgewater Park. The St. Joseph Autos played as a minor league affiliate of the St. Louis Browns in both seasons.

History
Minor league baseball began in St. Joseph, Michigan in 1940. The St. Joseph "Autos" became members of the reformed six–team Class C level Michigan State League, playing as a minor league affiliate of the St Louis Browns. The Autos joined the Flint Gems, Grand Rapids Dodgers, Lansing Lancers, Muskegon Reds and Saginaw Athletics in beginning league play on May 14, 1940.

The St. Joseph use of the "Autos" moniker corresponds to local industry. The Auto Specialties Manufacturing Company (AUSCO) was located in St. Joseph, Michigan and hosted the team at Edgewater Park, located on the company owned grounds.

In their first season of play, the 1940 St. Joseph Autos placed third in the Michigan State League standings and advanced to the finals. Beginning play on May 14, 1941, the Autos ended the 1940 regular season with a record of 52–51, playing under managers Conrad Fisher and Elmer Kirchoff. St. Joseph finished 12.5 games behind the first place Flint Gems in the final regular season standings. In the first round of the playoffs, St. Joseph defeated the Flint Gems 3 games to 2 to advance to the Finals. The Autos were matched against the Saginaw Athletics in the Finals, but the series was cancelled due to weather.

The St. Joseph Autos played their final season in 1941. St. Joseph placed second in the 1941 the Michigan State League final standings. The Autos ended the 1941 season with a 64–50 record as Henry McIntosh returned as manager. St. Joseph finished 9.0 games behind the first place and champion Flint Indians in the six–team league. No playoffs were held in 1941.

The Michigan State League permanently folded after the 1941 season. St. Joseph, Michigan has not hosted another minor league team.

After the demise of the minor league franchise, the St. Joseph "Auscos" continued play as a semi–professional team through 1957. On July 15, 1957, the Auscos hosted an exhibition against the Chicago White Sox, with Baseball Hall of Fame members manager Al Lopez and players Minnie Minoso, Nellie Fox and Luis Aparicio appearing in the game. The White Sox won the contest by the score of 4–1.

The ballpark
The St. Joseph Autos minor league teams played home games at Edgewater Park. The field had dimensions of (Left, Center, Right): 300–350–300. The ballpark cost $30,000 to construct and had a covered grandstand with bleachers. The ballpark was located on the property of the Auto Specialties Manufacturing Company (AUSCO).

Timeline

Year–by–year records

Notable alumni

Al LaMacchia (1941)
Babe Martin (1940)
Jim Russell (1940)
Marlin Stuart (1941)

See also
St. Joseph Autos players

References

External links
St. Joseph - Baseball Reference

Defunct minor league baseball teams
Defunct baseball teams in Michigan
Baseball teams established in 1940
Baseball teams disestablished in 1941
Michigan State League teams
St. Joseph, Michigan
St. Louis Browns minor league affiliates